These are some of the notable events relating to politics in 2011.

Events

January

 January 1 – Brazil inaugurates first female President, Dilma Rousseff
 January 6 – Investigation continues into BP oil spill off Gulf of Mexico
 January 8 – American congresswoman Gabby Giffords shot in Arizona
 January 14 – Amid the 2010–2011 Tunisian protests, long-time president Zine El Abidine Ben Ali dissolved the government, and flees the country due to opposition and military intervention, Tunisian PM steps in as interim President
 January 16 – Former President Jean-Claude Duvalier returns to Haiti 25 years after being overthrown
 January 17 – Reports of self-immolation spread across Africa
 January 17 – Allegations of sexual misconduct committed by Italian Prime Minister Berlusconi grow
 January 18 – Obama hosts Chinese President Hu at private dinner
 January 20 – New Tunisian government lifts bans on previously outlawed political groups, frees political prisoners
 January 22 – Algerians defy ban on government protests, protest in capital
 January 23 – The Green Party of Ireland pulls out of Irish government, forcing early elections
 January 24 – Suicide bomb detonated at Domodedovo airport in Russia
 January 24 – Protests in Yemeni capital Sanaa, spurned on by changes in Tunisia
 January 27 – Egyptian opposition leader and Nobel peace laureate Mohamed ElBaradei return to Cairo amid political unrest
 January 29 – Protest in Egypt continue, spurned on by reports from Tunisia, protesters believe President will soon step down
 January 30 – In a preliminary vote, 99% of South Sudan votes to split from the North, brought about by the 2005 peace agreement which ended two decades of war
 January 30 – Protesters in London march against Egyptian President Mubarak
 January 31 – Egyptian army rules out the use of force against the thousands of protesters across the country

February

 February 1 – King Abdullah II, King of Jordan, dismisses the government of Jordan, appoints new PM with orders to implement political reform
 February 1 – Egyptian President Mubarak says he will not run again after his current term ends, protesters do not capitulate
 February 3 – Gunfire in central Cairo, as pro-Mubarak protesters clash with anti-Mubarak protesters
 February 4 – Crowds grow in Tahrir Square as protesters rally to celebrate day of departure
 February 7 – Egyptian government raises pay of public sector workers by 15% in attempt to quell protests
 February 8 – North Korea and South Korea initiate military talks after year long hiatus
 February 11 – Amid the 2011 Egyptian revolution, long-time president Hosni Mubarak resigns
 February 12 – Egypt's military leaders, currently in control of country, pledge to uphold all existing international treaties
 February 13 – Egypt's military, currently in control of country, dissolve parliament and suspend constitution, stating they will control the country for 6 months or until elections can be held
 February 13 – Italian women stage anti Berlusconi demonstrations, in wake of allegations of sexual misconduct
 February 14 – Large protests around Algerian capital, protesters call for democratic leadership
 February 16 – Protests erupt in Benghazi, Libya
 February 16 – Police and pro democracy protesters clash] in Manama Bahrain
 February 20 – Clashes across the city of Benghazi leave 200 dead and 900 injured
 February 20 – Security forces shut down protests in Tehran
 February 22 – Libyan leader Muammar Gaddafi refuses to stand down amid wide spread protests
 February 25 – Barack Obama announces American sanctions against Gaddafi's Libya
 February 26 – UN Security Council unanimously approves sanctions against Libya
 February 27 – Unrest in Libya spark border crisis, as civilians attempting to flee violence cross into neighboring countries

March
 March 2 – Pakistani minority minister Shahbaz Bhatti killed in ambush in Islamabad

 March 4 – Libyan security forces force protesters from Tripoli, Gaddafi's stronghold
 March 5 – Saudi Arabia imposes ban on protests
 March 9 – Wisconsin bans collective bargaining for state's public employees
 March 10 – Security forces in Saudi Arabia shoot at protesters
 March 13 – Earthquake and Tsunami in Japan cause massive damage, Japanese Prime Minister says it is the worst crisis since the Second World War
 March 17 – UN Security Council approve a no fly zone in Libya in an effort to protect civilians
 March 20 – Egyptian voters vote in favor of constitutional amendments that pave the way for elections in June
 March 23 – 15 protesters are killed when security forces clash with anti-government protesters
 March 30 – Libya's foreign minister defects while in Britain, claims attacks on civilians as reason for defection
 March 30 – Syrian President Bashar Al-Assad does not lift state of emergency, in place for several decades

April
 April 3 – Protests spread in eastern Afghanistan in reaction to a Florida Priest burning the Quran

 April 6 – Portugal to seek bailout from EU, cite rising debt and inability to raise funds on international markets
 April 10 – France begins enforcing a ban on face veils, begins detaining those wearing face veils
 April 12 – Ex president of the Ivory Coast, Laurent Gbagbo is detained by UN recognized Ivory Coast government led by Alassane Ouattara, when Gbagbo refused to cede power after November elections
 April 13 – Egyptian prosecutors order the detention of Mubarak and his sons
 April 14 – American Congress votes to approve budget bill, financing the government through September
 April 20 – Syrian government passes law to lift decades old state of emergency, dissolve state security courts, and pass law to allow peaceful protests
 April 22 – Japanese government approves a disaster relief budget of 4 trillion Yen to begin the cleanup from March's tsunami
 April 23 – At least 75 people are killed in clashes between security forces and anti-regime protesters in Syria, planned funerals expected to draw large crowds
 April 23 – Yemeni President Ali Abdullah Saleh agrees to step down in exchange for immunity for him and his family, Saleh held power for 32 years
 April 24 – Pope Benedict XVI calls for peace in the Middle East and Africa, and mentions the plight of the Japanese people in Easter message
 April 27 – The Palestinian movements of Hamas and Fatah announced that they are ready to form a unity government, raising hopes for a more unified Palestine
 April 27 – President Obama releases his birth certificate
 April 29 – Prince William marries Catherine Middleton in royal wedding at Westminster Abbey
 April 30 – Syrian security forces surround and raid the Omari Mosque in Daraa
 April 30 – Gaddafi's youngest son and three grandchildren are killed in a Nato airstrike in Tripoli

May

 May 1 – Osama Bin Laden was killed in his compound by a US Navy.
 May 1 – Pope John Paul II is beatified
 May 2 – Canadian Prime Minister Stephen Harper wins majority in election, New Democratic Party takes opposition
 May 7 – The Pentagon releases the home videos of Osama Bin Laden, seized during raid on Bin Laden's compound
 May 12 – American and Pakistan officials question the wives of Osama bin Laden who were captured during the raid
 May 13 – Pakistani officials condemn unilateral American raid and drone strikes inside Pakistan
 May 16 – The head of the International Monetary Fund Dominique Strauss-Kahn is charged with an alleged sexual assault on a hotel maid
 May 16 – Israeli security forces and Pro-Palestinian protesters clash along Israel border, during Nakba Day protests
 May 17 – Queen Elizabeth II of the United Kingdom honors Irish people killed while fighting for independence from Britain
 May 19 – President Obama gives speech outlining America's policy toward the Middle East, specifically addressing the recent uprisings and protests occurring in the Arab world
 May 20 – President Obama and Israeli Prime Minister Netanyahu admit they do not share the same ideals on the path to Middle Eastern Peace
 May 24 – President Obama praises the United Kingdom's special ties with the United States, specifically citing their continued support post 9/11, and continued military support
 May 27 – Leaders meeting at the G8 summit in France say that Gaddafi must step down, British PM Cameron and French President Sarkozy plan visit to Libya
 May 29 – FIFA suspends 2 top executives amid bribery allegations, clears top executive Blatter
 May 30 – South African President Jacob Zuma visits Libya on a peace mission, seeking a diplomatic solution to the ongoing Libyan protests

June

 June 3 – Syrian security forces open fire on protester killing 34, government cuts Internet access in attempt to quell protests
 June 4 – Long time Yemen President Ali Abdullah Saleh heads to Saudi Arabia for medical treatment for injuries sustained during a rocket attack, the President's absence from the country prompted protests and rumors of his stepping down
 June 5 – Ollanta Humala is elected President of Peru
 June 13 – Several doctors and nurses from Bahrain go on trial for allegedly taking control of a hospital, storing weapons, and holding prisoners during anti-government protests
 June 18 – The Obama administration announced that they would begin peace talks with the Taliban, plan to eventually hand talks over to Afghan President Hamid Karzai and his peace council
 June 19 – The European Union announced that Greece would receive more loans to prevent the country from defaulting on previous loans
 June 21 – A Tunisian court has sentenced former President Ben Ali and his wife to jail in absentia for 35 years, for embezzlement and missing public funds

 June 22 – President Obama announced his plans to withdraw 10,000 troops from Afghanistan by the end of the year, and a total of 33,000 by the middle of 2012
 June 25 – Chinese activist Hu Jia was released from prison after serving three and a half years on subversion charges
 June 27 – The International Criminal Court at the Hague issues a warrant for Libyan leader Gadaffi, his son, and his spy chief
 June 28 – In a planned 2 day general strike demonstrators in Greece gather to protest the austerity measures proposed by the government and the EU
 June 29 – The government of Greece votes to accept proposed austerity measures
 June 30 – Prince William and Princess Kate arrive in Canada for a royal tour to coincide with Canada day

July

 July 4 – Thailand elects first female Prime Minister Yingluck Shinawatra, after her party Pheu Thai won a seat majority
 July 5 – Venezuelan President Hugo Chavez addresses crowd after return from Cuba for emergency cancer surgery
 July 7 – British newspaper News of the World shuts down amid accusations that it eavesdropped on numerous high-profile people
 July 8 – Space Shuttle Atlantis lifts off for final time
 July 9 – South Sudan becomes independent country, raises new flag, Salva Kiir becomes first President
 July 13 – United Kingdom lawmakers summon Rupert Murdoch, his son, and News of the World editor Rebekah Brooks to testify over phone hacking scandal
 July 13 – Eurozone summit reaches deal regarding Greek debt crisis, bailout package secured
 July 16 – The United States officially recognizes the Transitional National Council, as the legitimate government in Libya
 July 18 – London Police chief resigns amid News of the World phone hacking scandal
 July 20 – UK Parliament questions Prime Minister Cameron over News of the World phone hacking scandal, and his former communications director Andy Coulson
 July 21 – Space Shuttle Atlantis makes final landing, marks end of 30 years of shuttle flights
 July 22 – The 2011 Norway attacks were two sequential domestic terrorist attacks by Anders Behring Breivik against the government, the civilian population, and a Workers' Youth League (AUF) summer camp, in which 77 people were killed.
 July 29 – Republicans block proposed budget plan, causing roadblock in debt-ceiling crisis
 July 31 – Syrian security forces clash with protesters in Hama, at least 71 killed

August

 August 2 – President Obama signs U.S. debt bill, ending default threat
 August 3 – Former Egyptian President Hosni Mubarak pleads not guilty as trial begins, was brought to courtroom in a cage
 August 6 – S&P downgrades United States Government credit rating from AAA to AA+
 August 7 – Protesters in London riot in response to fatal police shooting
 August 10 – Protests in London subside after four nights of riots, Prime Minister Cameron vows 'fightback', increases number of police in city streets
 August 11 – Debate held for Republican nomination for the president
 August 16 – France and Germany call for closer economic and fiscal policy in the eurozone
 August 17 – Anti-corruption protester Anna Hazare on huger strike in prison, Prime Minister Manmohan Singh says strike is misconceived
 August 18 – President Obama and European leaders call for the resignation of Syrian leader Bashar al-Assad, new American sanctions against Syrian government
 August 21 – American hikers detained in Iran for two years sentenced to 8 years in prison, 5 years for cooperating with American Intelligence Services and 3 years for illegal entry
 August 24 – Kim Jong-il initiated rare talks with Russian Prime Minister Dmitry Medvedev, speaks about possibility of denuclearisation and economic cooperation
 August 29 – Libyan leader Muammar Gaddafi flees to Algeria with his wife and three children
 August 29 – Toomas Hendrik Ilves is re-elected President of Estonia.
 August 30 – Japan's governing party, the Democratic Party of Japan, votes Yoshihiko Noda as leader
 August 31 – Libyan Rebels issue ultimatum to troops still loyal to Muammar Qaddafi, rebels say loyalists must surrender or face an attack

September

 September 2 – Turkey expels Israeli diplomats in protest over Israeli raid on Gaza-bound ship, in which 9 Turkish nationals died
 September 6 – A convoy of armed Gaddafi loyalists flee from Libya across the Northern border into Niger
 September 10 – Protesters in Egypt force their way into the Israeli embassy in Cairo, following several days of protest outside the embassy
 September 11 – Ceremonies held across America remembering the victims of the 9/11 attacks a decade after the event
 September 13 – American embassy and NATO headquarters in Kabul attacked by suicide bombers
 September 15 – British Prime Minister David Cameron and French President Nicolas Sarkozy pledge aid for Libya's new provisional leaders
 September 17 – Occupy Wall Street begins in Zuccotti Park
 September 21 – Hikers detained in Iran are freed
 September 23 – Yemeni President Ali Abdullah Saleh returns from emergency medical treatment in Saudi Arabia
 September 24 – Palestine leader Mahmoud Abbas submits request to the United Nations to be recognized as a state
 September 24 – Vladimir Putin is set to return as Russia's President in 2012, Dmitry Medvedev the current President, will switch positions with Putin to become the Prime Minister
 September 25 – Women in Saudi Arabia gain the right to vote and to stand for election
 September 29 – Eurozone bailout fund is granted expanded powers in an attempt to stabilize the Euro

October

 October 2 – Greece is set to default on a bailout package despite austerity measures, the bailout package is less than a year old
 October 8 – Yemen's President Ali Abdullah Saleh promises to cede power, a promise he has made 3 times in 2011
 October 8 – Security council vetoes 2 resolutions on Syria, the drafts would have stopped aerial bombardment, the other would have urged a halt to hostilities
 October 9 – 23 people die amid clashes between Egyptian Security Forces and protesters
 October 9 – Germany's Merkel and France's Sarkozy agree to important changes to the way the Eurozone operates, in an attempt to end Euro crisis
 October 11 – Israel and Hamas agree to a prisoner swap, 1000 Palestinian prisoners for Israeli soldier Gilad Shalit
 October 15 – At least 70 people are injured in Rome, as protesters clash with police, amid protests inspired by Occupy Wall Street
 October 15 – Protesters from Occupy Wall Street move to fill Time's Square
 October 17 – Francois Hollande wins primary race of the French Socialist Party
 October 22 – Heir to Saudi throne Abdul Aziz Al Saud dies at 85
 October 23 – Libya's interim leaders declare liberation from the Gaddafi regime
 October 24 – U.S pull ambassador Robert Ford from Syria citing safety concerns
 October 28 – Heads of government of the 16 Commonwealth realms unanimously supported the changes to the royal succession
 October 31 – Global population reaches 7 Billion
 October 31 – UNESCO accept Palestine's bid for full membership

November

 November 2 – WikiLeaks founder Julian Assange loses court battle to remain in the United Kingdom, will be extradited to Sweden
 November 2 – Protesters from the Occupy Oakland movement shut down the Oakland Port
 November 3 – Greek Prime Minister George Papandreou scraps a referendum on Greece's bailout
 November 10 – Papademos named as new Prime Minister of Greece
 November 11 – The Italian Senate adopts an austerity law to avoid a bailout
 November 11 – Mexico's Interior Minister Francisco Blake Mora dies in helicopter crash
 November 12 – Silvio Berlusconi resigns as Italian Prime-Minister
 November 12 – The Arab League suspends Syria from meetings and adopts sanctions against Damascus, amid failure to end government crackdown on protesters
 November 14 – Mario Monti is named to replace outgoing Prime Minister Silvio Berlusconi
 November 15 – Colombia's FARC name Timoleon Jimenez as new leader
 November 18 – Hundreds of people are arrested as Occupy Wall Street protesters march across the Brooklyn Bridge
 November 18 – The UN's nuclear watchdog voices deep concern over Iranian Nuclear program
 November 20 – The People's Party of Spain win election in a landslide
 November 24 – Egyptian military appoint new Prime Minister Kamal Ganzouri
 November 28 – First day of Egyptian elections since the military seized power
 November 29 – Protesters in Iran storm the British embassy in Tehran
 November 30 – The UK expels all Iranian diplomats from country, citing embassy attack as cause

December
 December 1 – U.S. Secretary of State Hillary Clinton meets former political prisoner Aung San Suu Kyi in Burma
 December 3 – Herman Cain suspends his run for the office of President of the United States
 December 5 – Sarkozy and Merkel outline new Eurozone fiscal pact aimed at avoiding another debt crisis
 December 9 – Joseph Kabila is re-elected as the President of the DR Congo
 December 10 – Citizens of Russia gather to protest against alleged election fraud, the biggest protest in over 20 years
 December 12 – Canada pulls out of the Kyoto accord
 December 13 – The UN estimates at least 5000 people have been killed in crackdowns on anti-regime activists in Syria
 December 15 – Former Mayor of Paris, and President of France Jacques Chirac is found guilty on corruption charges
 December 16 – At least 10 people die in clashes between striking oil workers and government forces in Kazakhstan
 December 18 – Czech leader and playwright Vaclav Havel dies at 75
 December 18 – North Korean leader Kim Jong-Il dies at 69
 December 19 – Warrant issued by President of Iraq, for the arrest of Vice President on terrorism charges
 December 23 – US Congress passes payroll tax cut extension
 December 26 – Arab League sends observers to Syria, to monitor ongoing crisis
 December 28 – State funeral held for Kim Jong-il in North Korea
 December 29 – Son of Kim Jong-Il, Kim Jong-Un hailed as supreme leader of North Korea

References 

 
Politics by year
21st century in politics
2010s in politics